The Kiss Before the Mirror is a 1933 American pre-Code mystery film adapted from the 1932 play by  Ladislas Fodor, directed by James Whale and starring Nancy Carroll, Frank Morgan, Paul Lukas, and Gloria Stuart.

Plot
Attorney Paul Held is defending his friend, Walter Bernsdorf, who has been charged with the murder of his wife Lucy in Vienna. By Walter's account, Lucy was unfaithful to him during their marriage. After a court hearing, Paul returns home to his wife, Maria, and watches her as she applies make-up at her vanity. The scene reminds him of the one Walter described leading up to Lucy's murder. When Paul attempts to kiss Maria, she rebuffs him, criticizing him for ruining her make-up. She then leaves their home.

Paul follows Maria through the streets of Vienna, and observes her meeting with a male lover. This enrages Paul, and he fantasizes about murdering Maria; he also becomes obsessed with vindicating Walter of killing Lucy, hoping to prove in court that Walter's extreme love for her drove him to a crime of passion. Despite the parallels between the circumstances of Lucy's murder and Maria's current liaison, she still continues to visit her lover.

Paul insists that Maria be present during the final day of deliberations in Walter's trial. He makes an impassioned closing statement, which he concludes by revealing a gun and pointing it at Maria in the audience. She screams in horror and loses consciousness, after which Paul finishes his speech. While the jury deliberates, Paul meets Maria in his office, where she reacts in terror. She insists she still loves him despite her affair.

Walter is ultimately acquitted, and warns Paul against killing Maria, which he says he will regret. Paul heeds his advice, and asks Maria to leave the courthouse. Upon returning home, Paul angrily smashes Maria's vanity mirror. Maria appears behind him, and the two embrace.

Cast

Remake
The film was remade by Whale five years later as Wives Under Suspicion, starring Warren William and Gail Patrick.

References

External links
 

1933 crime drama films
1933 films
American courtroom films
Films directed by James Whale
American crime drama films
Films set in Vienna
Adultery in films
American black-and-white films
American films based on plays
American mystery films
1930s mystery films
1930s American films
1930s English-language films